Surfin' on a Backbeat is the third studio album by German pop singer Sasha, released by Warner Music on 29 October 2001 in German-speaking Europe.

Taking Sasha's work further into pop rock, Surfin' on a Backbeat  reached the top ten of the albums charts in Germany, but charted significantly lower than its predecessors. It was however, certified gold by the German leg of the IFPI for more than 200,000 sold copies. The album and its re-release produced four singles, including leading single "Here She Comes Again" and "This Is My Time", the 2002 FIFA World Cup television hymn. A reissue of the album was released on 22 July 2002, containing two previously unreleased tracks.

Track listing
 "Rooftop" – 4:09
 "Blown Away" – 3:21
 "Turn It into Something Special" – 4:41
 "One Look in Your Eyes" – 4:13
 "Here She Comes Again" – 3:55
 "Everybody Loves You" – 4:31
 "On and On" – 4:02
 "Let's Get Closer" – 3:17
 "Just a Second Away" – 4:14
 "Drive My Car" – 3:45
 "Days Like These" – 3:54
 "Why Does Everybody Hurt" – 3:35

2002 reissue
 "This Is My Time" – 3:37
 "Rooftop" – 4:09
 "Blown Away" – 3:21
 "Turn It into Something Special" – 4:41
 "One Look in Your Eyes" – 4:13
 "Here She Comes Again" – 3:55
 "Everybody Loves You" – 4:31
 "On and On" – 4:02
 "Let's Get Closer" – 3:17
 "Just a Second Away" – 4:14
 "Drive My Car" – 3:45
 "Days Like These" – 3:54
 "Why Does Everybody Hurt" – 3:35
 "Through the Barricades" – 6:16

Charts

Weekly charts

Certifications

References

External links 
 Sasha's official website

2001 albums
Sasha (German singer) albums